Nail Akhtyamovich Zamaliyev (born 9 July 1989) is a Russian professional football player. He plays for FC Amkar Perm.

Club career
He made his Russian Football National League debut for FC Salyut Belgorod on 31 March 2010 in a game against FC Kuban Krasnodar.

External links
 
 
 

1989 births
Footballers from Kazan
Living people
Russian footballers
Russia youth international footballers
FC Dynamo Moscow reserves players
FC Salyut Belgorod players
FC Sheriff Tiraspol players
PFC Spartak Nalchik players
FC Torpedo Moscow players
Russian expatriate footballers
Expatriate footballers in Moldova
FC SKA-Khabarovsk players
FC Tosno players
FC Volga Nizhny Novgorod players
Association football midfielders
FC Rotor Volgograd players
FC Luch Vladivostok players
FC Neftekhimik Nizhnekamsk players
FC Armavir players
FC Volgar Astrakhan players
FC Fakel Voronezh players
Moldovan Super Liga players
FC KAMAZ Naberezhnye Chelny players
FC Amkar Perm players